Artistry of the Mentally Ill: a contribution to the psychology and psychopathology of configuration is a 1922 book by psychiatrist Hans Prinzhorn, known as the work that launched the field of psychiatric art. It was the first attempt to analyze the drawings of the mentally ill not merely psychologically, but also aesthetically.

In the book, Prinzhorn presents the works of ten "schizophrenic masters", now housed in Prinzhorn Collection at the University Hospital Heidelberg, with in-depth aesthetic analysis of each and also full-color reproductions of their work. These ten masters were (birth names in parentheses):
 Karl Brendel (Genzel)
 August Klotz (Klett)
 Peter Meyer (Moog)
 August Neter (Natterer)
 Johann Knüpfer (Knopf)
 Viktor Orth (Clemens von Oertzen)
 Hermann Beil (Behle)
 Heinrich Welz (Hyacinth Freiherr von Wieser)
 Joseph Sell (Schneller)
 Franz Karl Bühler (Franz Pohl)

References

Resources
Hans Prinzhorn, Artistry of the mentally ill: a contribution to the psychology and psychopathology of configuration, translated by Eric von Brockdorff from the second German edition, with an introduction by James L. Foy, (Wien, New York: Springer-Verlag), 1972. .
Prinzhorn collection museum
Prinzhorn, Hans. Bildnerei der Geisteskranken (1922), at the University of Heidelberg Digital Library

1922 non-fiction books
Books about visual art
Works about outsider art